The 2022 Andalucía Challenger (branded as the 2022 AnyTech365 Andalucía Open for sponsorship reasons) was a professional clay court tennis tournament that took place from 28 March to 3 April 2022 at the Club de Tenis Puente Romano in Marbella, Spain. It was the fifth edition of the men's event and part of the 2022 ATP Challenger Tour. It was also the first edition of the women's event and a part of the 2022 WTA 125 calendar.

Men's singles main-draw entrants

Seeds

 1 Rankings are as of 21 March 2022.

Other entrants
The following players received wildcards into the singles main draw:
  Carlos Gimeno Valero
  Dominic Thiem
  Stan Wawrinka It was announced at the press conference that Stan Wawrinka, the former world number 3, would participate in ATP Challenger 125 in Puente Romano in Marbella. He achieved almost every possible milestone in professional tennis. Stan Wawrinka won three Grand Slam titles, 16 ATP titles and an Olympic gold in Beijing with Roger Federer in the men’s doubles category.  

The following players received entry into the singles main draw as alternates:
  Pedro Cachín
  Andrey Kuznetsov

The following players received entry from the qualifying draw:
  Javier Barranco Cosano
  Raúl Brancaccio
  Carlos Gómez-Herrera
  Lukáš Klein
  Pol Martín Tiffon
  Alexander Shevchenko

The following player received entry as a lucky loser:
  Nicolás Álvarez Varona

Women's singles main-draw entrants

Seeds

 1 Rankings are as of 21 March 2022.

Other entrants
The following players received wildcards into the singles main draw:
  Elina Avanesyan
  Irene Burillo Escorihuela
  Andrea Lázaro García
  Nastasja Schunk

The following players entered the main draw using a protected ranking:
  Elisabetta Cocciaretto
  Mandy Minella

Withdrawals 
Before the tournament
  Lucia Bronzetti → replaced by  Tamara Korpatsch
  Dalma Gálfi → replaced by  Mandy Minella
  Kristína Kučová → replaced by  Katarzyna Kawa
  Greet Minnen → replaced by  Rebeka Masarova
  Jule Niemeier → replaced by  Zhu Lin
  Diane Parry → replaced by  Anna Blinkova
  Nadia Podoroska → replaced by  Anna-Lena Friedsam
  Alison Van Uytvanck → replaced by  Ekaterine Gorgodze
  Maryna Zanevska → replaced by  Lesia Tsurenko
  Zheng Saisai → replaced by  Aleksandra Krunić

Women's doubles main-draw entrants

Seeds

 Rankings are as of March 21, 2022

Other entrants
The following pairs received wildcards into the doubles main draw: 
  Rebeka Masarova /  Panna Udvardy

Champions

Men's singles

 Jaume Munar def.  Pedro Cachín 6–2, 6–2.

Women's singles

  Mayar Sherif def.  Tamara Korpatsch 7–6(7–1), 6–4

Men's doubles

 Roman Jebavý /  Philipp Oswald def.  Hugo Nys /  Jan Zieliński 7–6(8–6), 3–6, [10–3].

Women's doubles

  Irina Bara /  Ekaterine Gorgodze def.  Vivian Heisen /  Katarzyna Kawa 6–4, 3–6, [10–6]

References

External links 
 

Andalucía Challenger
2022 WTA 125 tournaments
2022 in Spanish tennis
March 2022 sports events in Spain
April 2022 sports events in Spain
Sport in Marbella
2020s in Andalusia